Olivia Jayne Bartley (born 1982, Wollongong), who also performs as Olympia, is an Australian art-pop singer-songwriter-guitarist. She released her debut studio album Self Talk in April 2016 which received an ARIA Award nomination at the ARIA Music Awards of 2016.

Career

2013–2017: Career beginnings and Self Talk

In March 2013, Olympia released her self-titled, self-released debut extended play, which included her debut single "Atlantis".

In February 2015, Olympia released "Honey", the lead single from her forthcoming debut studio album. This was followed by "This Is Why We Can't Have Nice Things" and "Tourists". In March 2016, Olympia announced the release of her debut studio album Self Talk in April, alongside the single "Smoke Signals". Self Talk peaked at No. 26 on the ARIA Albums Chart. She was nominated for Breakthrough Artist at the ARIA Music Awards of 2016., and for the Australian Music Prize. Self Talk was co-produced by Burke Reid, with music videos directed by Alexander Smith. It was also the feature album on Triple J.

Olympia's 2016 performance at the Northcote Social Club was listed as the best live show of the year by Michael Dwyer of The Age. She was nominated for a gig at the National Live Music Awards in 2017. Olympia has appeared at the Falls Festival, The Great Escape Festival (United Kingdom), Sound City (UK) and Golden Plains Festival. Olivia Bartley has played lead guitar and vocals in Paul Dempsey's band.

2018–present: Flamingo

In August 2018, Olympia released "Star City", the lead single from her forthcoming second studio album, due in 2019. She promoted the single with an Australian tour.

In February 2019, "Shoot to Forget" was released as the second single. In May 2019, Olympia announced her second studio album would be titled Flamingo and is due for release on 5 July 2019.

Discography

Albums

EPs

Singles

Awards and nominations

ARIA Music Awards
The ARIA Music Awards is an annual awards ceremony that recognises excellence, innovation, and achievement across all genres of Australian music.

|-
| 2016 || Self Talk || Breakthrough Artist ||

Australian Music Prize
The Australian Music Prize is an annual award given to an Australian band or solo artist in recognition of the merit of an album released during the year of award.

|-
| 2016 || Self Talk || Australian Music Prize ||

J Awards
The J Awards are an annual series of Australian music awards that were established by the Australian Broadcasting Corporation's youth-focused radio station Triple J. They commenced in 2005.

|-
| J Awards of 2016
|  "Smoke Signals"
| Australian Video of the Year
|

Music Victoria Awards
The Music Victoria Awards are an annual awards night celebrating Victorian music. They commenced in 2006.

! 
|-
| Music Victoria Awards of 2019
| Olympia
| Best Solo Artist
| 
| 
|-

References

External links
www.olympiamusic.com.au

Australian electronic musicians
Living people
1982 births